Dennis Licht (born 30 May 1984, Apeldoorn) is a Dutch middle- and long-distance runner. He competed in the 5000 metres at the 2015 World Championships in Beijing without reaching the final.

International competitions

Personal bests
Outdoor
1500 metres – 3:39.94 (Hengelo 2015)
3000 metres – 7:54.91 (Braunschweig 2014)
5000 metres – 13:23.00 (Palo Alto 2015)
3000 metres steeplechase – 8:37.83 (Uden 2010)
Indoor
1500 metres – 3:41.40 (Apeldoorn 2009)
3000 metres – 7:59.09 (Apeldoorn 2015)

References

External links

1984 births
Living people
Sportspeople from Apeldoorn
Dutch male middle-distance runners
Dutch male long-distance runners
Dutch male steeplechase runners
World Athletics Championships athletes for the Netherlands
21st-century Dutch people